The list of ship commissionings in 2013 includes a chronological list of all ships commissioned in 2013.


See also

References 

2013